This is a list of schools in Cheshire East, a unitary authority in Cheshire, England.

State-funded schools

Primary schools

Acton CE Primary Academy, Acton
Adlington Primary School, Adlington
Alderley Edge Community Primary School, Alderley Edge
Alsager Highfields Community Primary School, Alsager
Ash Grove Academy, Macclesfield
Ashdene Primary School, Wilmslow
Astbury St Mary's CE Primary School, Newbold Astbury
Audlem St James' CE Primary School, Audlem
Beechwood Primary School and Nursery, Crewe
The Berkeley Academy, Wistaston
Bexton Primary School, Knutsford
Bickerton Holy Trinity CE Primary School, Bickerton
Black Firs Primary School, Congleton
Bollinbrook CE Primary School, Macclesfield
Bollington Cross CE Primary School, Bollington
Bollington St John's CE Primary School, Bollington
Bosley St Mary's CE Primary School, Bosley
Brereton CE Primary School, Brereton Green
Bridgemere CE Primary School, Bridgemere
Brierley Primary School, Crewe
Broken Cross Primary Academy and Nursery, Macclesfield
Buglawton Primary School, Congleton
Bunbury Aldersey School, Bunbury
Calveley Primary Academy, Calveley
Chelford CE Primary School, Chelford
Christ the King RC and CE Primary School, Macclesfield
Cledford Primary School, Middlewich
Cranberry Academy, Alsager
Daven Primary School, Congleton
Dean Valley Community Primary School, Bollington
The Dingle Primary School, Haslington
Disley Primary School, Disley
Edleston Primary School, Crewe
Egerton Primary School, Knutsford
Elworth CE Primary School, Elworth
Elworth Hall Primary School, Elworth
Excalibur Primary School, Alsager
Gainsborough Primary and Nursery School, Crewe
Gawsworth Primary School, Gawsworth
Goostrey Primary School, Goostrey
Gorsey Bank Primary School, Wilmslow
Handforth Grange Primary School, Handforth
Haslington Primary Academy, Haslington
Havannah Primary School, Congleton
Hermitage Primary School, Holmes Chapel
High Legh Primary School, High Legh
Highfields Academy, Nantwich
Hollinhey Primary School, Sutton Lane Ends
Holmes Chapel Primary School, Holmes Chapel
Hungerford Primary Academy, Crewe
Hurdsfield Community Primary School, Macclesfield
Ivy Bank Primary School, Macclesfield
Kettleshulme St James' CE Primary School, Kettleshulme
Lacey Green Primary Academy, Wilmslow
Leighton Academy, Crewe
Lindow Community Primary School, Wilmslow
Little Bollington CE Primary School, Little Bollington
Lostock Hall Primary School, Poynton
Lower Park School, Poynton
Mablins Lane Community Primary School, Crewe
Manor Park Primary School and Nursery, Knutsford
Marlborough Primary School, Tytherington
Marlfields Primary School, Congleton
Marton & District CE Primary School, Marton
Middlewich Primary School, Middlewich
Millfields Primary School and Nursery, Nantwich
Mobberley CE Primary School, Mobberley
Monks Coppenhall Academy, Crewe
Mossley CE Primary School, Congleton
Mottram St Andrew Primary Academy, Mottram St Andrew
Nantwich Primary Academy, Nantwich
Nether Alderley Primary School, Nether Alderley
Offley Primary Academy, Sandbach
Parkroyal Community School, Macclesfield
Pear Tree Primary School, Stapeley
Pebble Brook Primary School, Crewe
Peover Superior Endowed Primary School, Over Peover
Pikemere School, Alsager
Pott Shrigley Church School, Pott Shrigley
Prestbury CE Primary School, Prestbury
Puss Bank School and Nursery, Macclesfield
The Quinta Primary School, Congleton
Rainow Primary School, Rainow
Rode Heath Primary School, Rode Heath
St Alban's RC Primary School, Macclesfield
St Anne's RC Primary School, Nantwich
St Anne's Fulshaw CE Primary School, Wilmslow
St Benedict's RC Primary School, Handforth
St Gabriel's RC Primary School, Alsager
St Gregory's RC Primary School, Bollington
St John the Evangelist CE Primary School, Macclesfield
St John's CE Primary School, Sandbach
St Mary's RC Primary School, Congleton
St Mary's RC Primary School, Crewe
St Mary's RC Primary School, Middlewich
St Michael's Community Academy, Crewe
St Oswald's Worleston CE Primary School, Aston juxta Mondrum
St Paul's RC Primary School, Poynton
St Vincent's RC Primary School, Knutsford
Sandbach Primary Academy, Sandbach
Scholar Green Primary School, Scholar Green
Shavington Primary School, Shavington
Smallwood CE Primary School, Sandbach
Sound and District Primary School, Sound
Stapeley Broad Lane CE Primary School, Stapeley
Styal Primary School, Styal
Underwood West Academy, Crewe 
Upton Priory School, Macclesfield
Vernon Primary School, Poynton
Vine Tree Primary School, Crewe
Warmingham CE Primary School, Warmingham
Weaver Primary School, Nantwich
Weston Village Primary School, Weston
Wheelock Primary School, Sandbach
Whirley Primary School, Macclesfield
Willaston Primary Academy, Willaston
The Wilmslow Academy, Wilmslow
Wilmslow Grange Community Primary & Nursery School
Wincle CE Primary School, Wincle
Wistaston Academy, Wistaston
Wistaston Church Lane Academy, Wistaston
Woodcock's Well CE Primary School, Mow Cop
Worth Primary School, Poynton
Wrenbury Primary School, Wrenbury
Wybunbury Delves CE Primary School, Wybunbury

Secondary schools

All Hallows' Catholic College, Macclesfield
Alsager School, Alsager
Brine Leas School, Nantwich
Cheshire Studio School, Knutsford
Congleton High School, Congleton
Crewe Engineering and Design UTC, Crewe
Eaton Bank Academy, Congleton
The Fallibroome Academy, Macclesfield
Holmes Chapel Comprehensive School, Holmes Chapel
Knutsford Academy, Knutsford
The Macclesfield Academy, Macclesfield
Malbank School and Sixth Form College, Nantwich
Middlewich High School, Middlewich
The Oaks Academy, Crewe
Poynton High School, Poynton
Ruskin High School, Crewe
St Thomas More Catholic High School, Crewe
Sandbach High School and Sixth Form College, Sandbach
Sandbach School, Sandbach
Shavington Academy, Crewe
Sir William Stanier School, Crewe
Tytherington School, Tytherington
Wilmslow High School, Wilmslow

Special and alternative schools

Adelaide Heath Academy, Knutsford
Adelaide School, Crewe
The Axis Academy, Crewe
The Fermain Academy, Macclesfield
NAS Church Lawton School, Church Lawton
Oakfield Lodge School, Crewe
Park Lane School, Macclesfield
Springfield School, Crewe

Further education
Macclesfield College, Macclesfield
Reaseheath College, Nantwich
Cheshire College – South & West, Crewe

Independent schools

Primary and preparatory schools
Pownall Hall School, Wilmslow
The Ryleys School, Alderley Edge
Terra Nova School, Holmes Chapel
Wilmslow Preparatory School, Wilmslow
Yorston Lodge School, Knutsford

Senior and all-through schools
Alderley Edge School for Girls, Alderley Edge
Beech Hall School, Tytherington
The King's School, Prestbury

Special and alternative schools

Aidenswood, Congleton
Cheshire Alternative Provision School, Congleton
Compass Community School Cheshire, Middlewich
Cornerstone Academy, Congleton
David Lewis School, Little Warford
Eden School, Macclesfield
Esland Daven School, Congleton
High Peak School, Disley
Lavender Field School, Crewe
Norbury Court School, Poynton
Oracle Care & Education, Congleton

Further education
David Lewis Centre, Little Warford

References

 
Cheshire East